The women's shot put at the 2006 European Athletics Championships were held at the Ullevi on August 11 and August 12.

Nadzeya Astapchuk had originally won the silver medal but later tested for doping and all her results between 13 August 2005 and 12 August 2007 were annulled.

Medalists

Schedule

Results

Qualification
Qualification: Qualifying Performance 17.75 (Q) or at least 12 best performers (q) advance to the final.

Final

External links
Results

Shot put
Shot put at the European Athletics Championships
2006 in women's athletics